The Hood Octagonal School is a historic octagonal schoolhouse located in Newtown Square, Delaware County, Pennsylvania.  It was built in 1841, and is a small, fieldstone, one-story, eight sided building with a wood shingled pyramidal roof.  The school was abandoned about 1865, then restored in 1964.

It was added to the National Register of Historic Places in 2006. The Newtown Square Historical Society says it was built by James Dunwoody, father of William Hood Dunwoody, to replace an earlier log school built by James' father.

References

One-room schoolhouses in Pennsylvania
School buildings on the National Register of Historic Places in Pennsylvania
Octagonal school buildings in the United States
School buildings completed in 1841
Schools in Delaware County, Pennsylvania
National Register of Historic Places in Delaware County, Pennsylvania
1841 establishments in Pennsylvania